The 2009–10 Charlotte Bobcats season was the 20th season of NBA basketball in Charlotte, and their 6th as the Charlotte Bobcats. Michael Jordan bought controlling interest in the team from founding owner Bob Johnson in March.

The season saw the franchise finish with its first winning record and playoff appearance in its current incarnation. However, their playoff stay was short-lived, as they were swept by the Orlando Magic in four games.

Key dates 
 June 25 – The 2009 NBA draft took place in New York City.
 July 8 – The free agency period started.

Offseason

2009 NBA draft 

The Charlotte Bobcats made the following selections:

Free agency 
Charlotte free agents:
 Raymond Felton
 Juwan Howard
 Dontell Jefferson
 Sean Singletary

Roster

Pre-season 

|- align="center" bgcolor="#ffcccc"
| 1 || October 6 || @Cleveland Cavaliers || 87–92 || || || || 20,403 || 0–1 recap
|- align="center" bgcolor="#ccffcc"
| 2 || October 8 || New Orleans Hornets || 101–108 || || || || 8,623(Greensboro, North Carolina) || 1–1 recap
|- align="center" bgcolor="#ffcccc"
| 3 || October 10 || Cleveland Cavaliers || 102–96 || || || || 11,489(North Charleston, South Carolina) || 1–2 recap
|- align="center" bgcolor="#ffcccc"
| 4 || October 12 || @Atlanta Hawks || 90–107 || || || || 6,960 || 1–3 recap
|- align="center" bgcolor="#ffcccc"
| 5 || October 17 || @Los Angeles Lakers || 87–91 || || || || 18,422 || 1–4 recap
|- align="center" bgcolor="#ffcccc"
| 6 || October 18 || Utah Jazz || 110–103 || || || || –(Los Angeles) || 1–5 recap
|- align="center" bgcolor="#ccffcc"
| 7 || October 20 || Milwaukee Bucks || 87–94 || || || || 7,582 || 2–5 recap
|- align="center" bgcolor="#ffcccc"
| 8 || October 23 || Memphis Grizzlies || 95–92 || || || || 19,077 || 2–6 recap
|-

Regular season

Standings

Record vs. opponents

Game log 

|- bgcolor="#ffcccc"
| 1
| October 28
| @ Boston
| 
| Gerald Wallace (10)
| Gerald Wallace (12)
| D. J. Augustin (4)
| TD Garden18,624
| 0–1
|- bgcolor="#ccffcc"
| 2
| October 30
| New York
| 
| Raymond Felton (22)
| Gerald Wallace (15)
| Raymond Felton (9)
| Time Warner Cable Arena18,624
| 1–1
|- bgcolor="#ffcccc"
| 3
| October 31
| @ Cleveland
| 
| Vladimir Radmanović (12)
| Gerald Wallace (9)
| Boris Diaw (9)
| Quicken Loans Arena20,562
| 1–2

|- bgcolor="#ccffcc"
| 4
| November 2
| New Jersey
| 
| Gerald Wallace (24)
| Gerald Wallace (20)
| Boris Diaw, Raymond Felton (3)
| Time Warner Cable Arena9,380
| 2–2
|- bgcolor="#ccffcc"
| 5
| November 6
| Atlanta
| 
| Raja Bell (24)
| Tyson Chandler (10)
| Raymond Felton (7)
| Time Warner Cable Arena15,874
| 3-2
|- bgcolor="#ffcccc"
| 6
| November 7
| @ Chicago
| 
| Boris Diaw (20)
| Gerald Wallace (9)
| Raymond Felton (10)
| United Center21,108
| 3-3
|- bgcolor="#ffcccc"
| 7
| November 10
| Orlando
| 
| Raymond Felton (18)
| Gerald Wallace (9)
| Boris Diaw (8)
| Time Warner Cable Arena13,415
| 3-4
|- bgcolor="#ffcccc"
| 8
| November 11
| @ Detroit
| 
| Nazr Mohammed (13)
| Nazr Mohammed (8)
| Raymond Felton, Boris Diaw (4)
| The Palace of Auburn Hills15,417
| 3-5
|- bgcolor="#ffcccc"
| 9
| November 14
| Portland
| 
| Boris Diaw (21)
| Gerald Wallace, Tyson Chandler (8)
| Raymond Felton, Boris Diaw (4)
| Time Warner Cable Arena15,872
| 3-6
|- bgcolor="#ffcccc"
| 10
| November 16
| @ Orlando
| 
| Ronald Murray (31)
| Gerald Wallace, Stephen Jackson (9)
| Raymond Felton (5)
| Amway Arena17,461
| 3-7
|- bgcolor="#ffcccc"
| 11
| November 18
| @ Philadelphia
| 
| Stephen Jackson (26)
| Gerald Wallace (12)
| Raymond Felton, Stephen Jackson (5)
| Wachovia Center11,585
| 3-8
|- bgcolor="#ffcccc"
| 12
| November 20
| @ Milwaukee
| 
| Stephen Jackson, Gerald Wallace (22)
| Gerald Wallace (10)
| Ronald Murray (6)
| Bradley Center15,578
| 3-9
|- bgcolor="#ccffcc"
| 13
| November 22
| Indiana
| 
| Boris Diaw (17)
| Gerald Wallace (11)
| Raymond Felton (6)
| Time Warner Cable Arena14,730
| 4-9
|- bgcolor="#ccffcc"
| 14
| November 25
| Toronto
| 
| Gerald Wallace (31)
| Gerald Wallace (13)
| Stephen Jackson (6)
| Time Warner Cable Arena13,689
| 5-9
|- bgcolor="#ccffcc"
| 15
| November 27
| Cleveland
| 
| Gerald Wallace (31)
| Gerald Wallace (14)
| Raymond Felton (7)
| Time Warner Cable Arena19,168
| 6-9
|- bgcolor="#ccffcc"
| 16
| November 28
| @ Washington
| 
| Gerald Wallace (14)
| Gerald Wallace (14)
| Boris Diaw (6)
| Verizon Center17,311
| 7-9

|- bgcolor="#ffcccc"
| 17
| December 1
| Boston
| 
| Nazr Mohammed (16)
| Gerald Wallace (8)
| Raymond Felton (5)
| Time Warner Cable Arena15,129
| 7-10
|- bgcolor="#ffcccc"
| 18
| December 4
| @ New Jersey
| 
| Stephen Jackson, Raymond Felton (28)
| Gerald Wallace (20)
| Boris Diaw (6)
| Izod Center12,131
| 7-11
|- bgcolor="#ccffcc"
| 19
| December 5
| Philadelphia
| 
| Boris Diaw (28)
| Gerald Wallace (14)
| Raymond Felton (8)
| Time Warner Cable Arena13,352
| 8-11
|- bgcolor="#ccffcc"
| 20
| December 8
| Denver
| 
| Stephen Jackson, Gerald Wallace (25)
| Gerald Wallace (16)
| Stephen Jackson (6)
| Time Warner Cable Arena14,127
| 9-11
|- bgcolor="#ffcccc"
| 21
| December 11
| @ San Antonio
| 
| Stephen Jackson (23)
| Gerald Wallace (6)
| Raymond Felton (5)
| AT&T Center17,508
| 9-12
|- bgcolor="#ffcccc"
| 22
| December 12
| @ Dallas
| 
| Stephen Jackson (28)
| Gerald Wallace (16)
| Raymond Felton (8)
| American Airlines Center20,151
| 9-13
|- bgcolor="#ccffcc"
| 23
| December 15
| New York
| 
| Stephen Jackson (24)
| Tyson Chandler (12)
| Raymond Felton (6)
| Time Warner Cable Arena13,606
| 10-13
|- bgcolor="#ffcccc"
| 24
| December 16
| @ Indiana
| 
| Gerald Wallace (29)
| Tyson Chandler (13)
| D. J. Augustin (6)
| Conseco Fieldhouse11,888
| 10-14
|- bgcolor="#ffcccc"
| 25
| December 19
| Utah
| 
| Gerald Wallace (30)
| Gerald Wallace (13)
| Gerald Wallace, Boris Diaw (5)
| Time Warner Cable Arena14,963
| 10-15
|- bgcolor="#ffcccc"
| 26
| December 20
| @ New York
| 
| Raymond Felton (27)
| Tyson Chandler (14)
| Raymond Felton (7)
| Madison Square Garden18,767
| 10-16
|- bgcolor="#ccffcc"
| 27
| December 22
| Detroit
| 
| Gerald Wallace (29)
| Gerald Wallace (12)
| Raymond Felton (8)
| Time Warner Cable Arena16,864
| 11-16
|- bgcolor="#ffcccc"
| 28
| December 26
| @ Oklahoma City
| 
| Stephen Jackson (24)
| Stephen Jackson, Nazr Mohammed (8)
| Stephen Jackson, Raymond Felton (5)
| Ford Center17,961
| 11-17
|- bgcolor="#ccffcc"
| 29
| December 28
| Milwaukee
| 
| Gerald Wallace (21)
| Gerald Wallace (14)
| Boris Diaw (5)
| Time Warner Cable Arena15,473
| 12-17
|- bgcolor="#ffcccc"
| 30
| December 30
| @ Toronto
| 
| Stephen Jackson (30)
| Gerald Wallace (16)
| Stephen Jackson (5)
| Air Canada Centre18,979
| 12-18

|- bgcolor="#ccffcc"
| 31
| January 2
| @ Miami
| 
| Stephen Jackson (35)
| Stephen Jackson, Gerald Wallace (8)
| Raymond Felton (6)
| American Airlines Arena17,856
| 13-18
|- bgcolor="#ccffcc"
| 32
| January 3
| @ Cleveland
| 
| Stephen Jackson (22)
| Gerald Wallace (12)
| Raymond Felton, Boris Diaw (6)
| Quicken Loans Arena20,562
| 14-18
|- bgcolor="#ccffcc"
| 33
| January 5
| Chicago
| 
| Gerald Wallace (32)
| Gerald Wallace (9)
| Raymond Felton, Boris Diaw (6)
| Time Warner Cable Arena13,749
| 15-18
|- bgcolor="#ffcccc"
| 34
| January 7
| @ New York
| 
| Stephen Jackson (26)
| Gerald Wallace (9)
| Raymond Felton (9)
| Madison Square Garden19,763
| 15-19
|- bgcolor="#ccffcc"
| 35
| January 9
| Memphis
| 
| Raymond Felton (19)
| Boris Diaw (10)
| Boris Diaw (6)
| Time Warner Cable Arena15,438
| 16-19
|- bgcolor="#ccffcc"
| 36
| January 12
| Houston
| 
| Stephen Jackson (43)
| Stephen Jackson, Gerald Wallace (8)
| Boris Diaw (6)
| Time Warner Cable Arena11,463
| 17-19
|- bgcolor="#ccffcc"
| 37
| January 15
| San Antonio
| 
| Boris Diaw(26)
| Boris Diaw (11)
| D. J. Augustin (7)
| Time Warner Cable Arena15,742
| 18-19
|- bgcolor="#ccffcc"
| 38
| January 16
| Phoenix
| 
| Gerald Wallace, Stephen Jackson (29)
| Gerald Wallace (13)
| Stephen Jackson (8)
| Time Warner Cable Arena17,574
| 19-19
|- bgcolor="#ccffcc"
| 39
| January 18
| Sacramento
| 
| Gerald Wallace (28)
| Raymond Felton (9)
| Raymond Felton (10)
| Time Warner Cable Arena13,678
| 20-19
|- bgcolor="#ccffcc"
| 40
| January 20
| Miami
| 
| Stephen Jackson (24)
| Gerald Wallace, Nazr Mohammed (10)
| Raymond Felton (5)
| Time Warner Cable Arena14,212
| 21-19
|- bgcolor="#ffcccc"
| 41
| January 22
| @ Atlanta
| 
| Gerald Wallace (25)
| Nazr Mohammed, Gerald Wallace, Stephen Jackson (6)
| Ronald Murray (9)
| Philips Arena14,701
| 21-20
|- bgcolor="#ffcccc"
| 42
| January 23
| Orlando
| 
| D. J. Augustin (22)
| Gerald Wallace, Boris Diaw (10)
| Boris Diaw (5)
| Time Warner Cable Arena19,277
| 21-21
|- bgcolor="#ffcccc"
| 43
| January 25
| @ Denver
| 
| Stephen Jackson (22)
| Gerald Wallace (7)
| Raymond Felton (9)
| Pepsi Center16,909
| 21-22
|- bgcolor="#ccffcc"
| 44
| January 26
| @ Phoenix
| 
| Stephen Jackson (30)
| Boris Diaw (11)
| Stephen Jackson, Boris Diaw (5)
| US Airways Center15,722
| 22-22
|- bgcolor="#ccffcc"
| 45
| January 29
| @ Golden State
| 
| Gerald Wallace, Stephen Jackson (30)
| Gerald Wallace (13)
| D. J. Augustin, Raymond Felton (6)
| Oracle Arena17,850
| 23-22
|- bgcolor="#ccffcc"
| 46
| January 30
| @ Sacramento
| 
| Gerald Wallace (38)
| Gerald Wallace (11)
| Stephen Jackson (8)
| ARCO Arena14,186
| 24-22

|- bgcolor="#ffcccc"
| 47
| February 1
| @ Portland
| 
| Raymond Felton (23)
| Gerald Wallace (10)
| Stephen Jackson (4)
| Rose Garden20,106
| 24-23
|- bgcolor="#ffcccc"
| 48
| February 3
| @ L.A. Lakers
| 
| Stephen Jackson (30)
| Nazr Mohammed (17)
| Boris Diaw (5)
| Staples Center18,997
| 24-24
|- bgcolor="#ffcccc"
| 49
| February 6
| New Orleans
| 
| Stephen Jackson (26)
| Boris Diaw (8)
| Raymond Felton (7)
| Time Warner Cable Arena19,164
| 24-25
|- bgcolor="#ccffcc"
| 50
| February 9
| Washington
| 
| Stephen Jackson (22)
| Nazr Mohammed (10)
| Raymond Felton (5)
| Time Warner Cable Arena12,376
| 25-25
|- bgcolor="#ccffcc"
| 51
| February 10
| @ Minnesota
| 
| Stephen Jackson (33)
| Nazr Mohammed (20)
| D. J. Augustin (7)
| Target Center13,352
| 26-25
|- bgcolor="#ffcccc"
| 52
| February 16
| New Jersey
| 
| Gerald Wallace (21)
| Gerald Wallace, Boris Diaw (10)
| Stephen Jackson (5)
| Time Warner Cable Arena13,712
| 26-26
|- bgcolor="#ccffcc"
| 53
| February 19
| Cleveland
| 
| Stephen Jackson (29)
| Tyrus Thomas (12)
| Boris Diaw (9)
| Time Warner Cable Arena19,568
| 27-26
|- bgcolor="#ffcccc"
| 54
| February 20
| @ Milwaukee
| 
| Stephen Jackson (35)
| Tyrus Thomas (11)
| Stephen Jackson (5)
| Bradley Center17,174
| 27-27
|- bgcolor="#ffcccc"
| 55
| February 22
| @ L.A. Clippers
| 
| Gerald Wallace (32)
| Gerald Wallace (12)
| Boris Diaw, Raymond Felton (9)
| Staples Center15,892
| 27-28
|- bgcolor="#ffcccc"
| 56
| February 24
| @ Utah
| 
| Gerald Wallace (27)
| Gerald Wallace (8)
| Raymond Felton (5)
| EnergySolutions Arena19,911
| 27-29
|- bgcolor="#ccffcc"
| 57
| February 26
| @ Memphis
| 
| Stephen Jackson (32)
| Stephen Jackson (11)
| Raymond Felton (7)
| FedExForum14,713
| 28-29

|- bgcolor="#ffcccc"
| 58
| March 1
| Dallas
| 
| Stephen Jackson (20)
| Tyrus Thomas (12)
| Raymond Felton (5)
| Time Warner Cable Arena15,691
| 28-30
|- bgcolor="#ffcccc"
| 59
| March 3
| @ Boston
| 
| Tyrus Thomas (15)
| Tyrus Thomas (10)
| Raymond Felton (6)
| TD Garden18,624
| 28-31
|- bgcolor="#ccffcc"
| 60
| March 5
| L.A. Lakers
| 
| Stephen Jackson (21)
| Gerald Wallace (10)
| D. J. Augustin, Boris Diaw (5)
| Time Warner Cable Arena19,568
| 29-31
|- bgcolor="#ccffcc"
| 61
| March 6
| Golden State
| 
| D. J. Augustin (19)
| Boris Diaw (12)
| Boris Diaw (9)
| Time Warner Cable Arena19,392
| 30-31
|- bgcolor="#ccffcc"
| 62
| March 9
| Miami
| 
| Stephen Jackson (17)
| Gerald Wallace (17)
| Raymond Felton (11)
| Time Warner Cable Arena18,646
| 31-31
|- bgcolor="#ccffcc"
| 63
| March 10
| @ Philadelphia
| 
| Gerald Wallace (28)
| Stephen Jackson (10)
| Raymond Felton (6)
| Wachovia Center11,358
| 32-31
|- bgcolor="#ccffcc"
| 64
| March 12
| L.A. Clippers
| 
| Stephen Jackson (24)
| Tyson Chandler (9)
| Raymond Felton (11)
| Time Warner Cable Arena15,835
| 33-31
|- bgcolor="#ccffcc"
| 65
| March 14
| @ Orlando
| 
| Stephen Jackson (28)
| Theo Ratliff, Tyrus Thomas (9)
| Raymond Felton (7)
| Amway Arena17,461
| 34-31
|- bgcolor="#ffcccc"
| 66
| March 16
| @ Indiana
| 
| Boris Diaw, Stephen Jackson (20)
| Stephen Jackson (9)
| Raymond Felton, Stephen Jackson (6)
| Conseco Fieldhouse10,850
| 34-32
|- bgcolor="#ccffcc"
| 67
| March 17
| Oklahoma City
| 
| Stephen Jackson (20)
| Tyrus Thomas (9)
| Raymond Felton (7)
| Time Warner Cable Arena16,179
| 35-32
|- bgcolor="#ffcccc"
| 68
| March 19
| @ Atlanta
| 
| Raymond Felton (25)
| Gerald Wallace (16)
| Boris Diaw (6)
| Philips Arena17,697
| 35-33
|- bgcolor="#ffcccc"
| 69
| March 20
| @ Miami
| 
| Stephen Jackson (18)
| Tyson Chandler (11)
| Raymond Felton (5)
| American Airlines Arena18,766
| 35-34
|- bgcolor="#ccffcc"
| 70
| March 23
| @ Washington
| 
| Gerald Wallace, Boris Diaw (17)
| Gerald Wallace (19)
| Raymond Felton (5)
| Verizon Center12,742
| 36-34
|- bgcolor="#ccffcc"
| 71
| March 24
| Minnesota
| 
| Stephen Jackson (37)
| Tyson Chandler (9)
| Raymond Felton (8)
| Time Warner Cable Arena14,457
| 37-34
|- bgcolor="#ccffcc"
| 72
| March 26
| Washington
| 
| Gerald Wallace (23)
| Gerald Wallace (6)
| Raymond Felton (11)
| Time Warner Cable Arena16,365
| 38-34
|- bgcolor="#ffcccc"
| 73
| March 29
| Toronto
| 
| Stephen Jackson, Raymond Felton (18)
| Gerald Wallace (8)
| Boris Diaw, Raymond Felton (7)
| Time Warner Cable Arena14,534
| 38-35
|- bgcolor="#ccffcc"
| 74
| March 31
| Philadelphia
| 
| Gerald Wallace (24)
| Gerald Wallace (12)
| Raymond Felton (6)
| Time Warner Cable Arena14,139
| 39-35

|- bgcolor="#ccffcc"
| 75
| April 2
| Milwaukee
| 
| Stephen Jackson (32)
| Gerald Wallace (11)
| Raymond Felton (6)
| Time Warner Cable Arena18,118
| 40-35
|- bgcolor="#ffcccc"
| 76
| April 3
| @ Chicago
| 
| Boris Diaw (18)
| Boris Diaw (7)
| Boris Diaw (6)
| United Center20,996
| 40-36
|- bgcolor="#ccffcc"
| 77
| April 6
| Atlanta
| 
| Gerald Wallace (28)
| Boris Diaw (9)
| Boris Diaw (9)
| Time Warner Cable Arena18,610
| 41-36
|- bgcolor="#ccffcc"
| 78
| April 7
| @ New Orleans
| 
| Stephen Jackson (29)
| Tyson Chandler (10)
| Raymond Felton (7)
| New Orleans Arena13,333
| 42-36
|- bgcolor="#ffcccc"
| 79
| April 9
| @ Houston
| 
| Gerald Wallace, Boris Diaw (18)
| Tyson Chandler (12)
| Boris Diaw, Raymond Felton (5)
| Toyota Center16,488
| 42-37
|- bgcolor="#ccffcc"
| 80
| April 10
| Detroit
| 
| Larry Hughes (18)
| Stephen Jackson, Theo Ratliff (6)
| D. J. Augustin (9)
| Time Warner Cable Arena19,328
| 43-37
|- bgcolor="#ccffcc"
| 81
| April 12
| @ New Jersey
| 
| Stephen Jackson (17)
| Stephen Jackson (9)
| Raymond Felton (8)
| Izod Center14,118
| 44-37
|- bgcolor="#ffcccc"
| 82
| April 14
| Chicago
| 
| Tyrus Thomas (16)
| Tyrus Thomas (9)
| Raymond Felton (5)
| Time Warner Cable Arena17,439
| 44-38
|-

Playoffs

Game log 

|- bgcolor = "#ffcccc"
| 1
| April 18
| @Orlando
| 
| Gerald Wallace (25)
| Gerald Wallace (17)
| Raymond Felton (4)
| Amway Arena17,461
| 0–1
|- bgcolor = "#ffcccc"
| 2
| April 21
| @Orlando
| 
| Stephen Jackson (27)
| Boris Diaw (7)
| Boris Diaw (4)Raymond Felton (4)
| Amway Arena17,461
| 0–2
|- bgcolor = "#ffcccc"
| 3
| April 24
| Orlando
| 
| Stephen Jackson (19)
| Gerald Wallace (8)
| Boris Diaw (6)Raymond Felton (6)
| Time Warner Cable Arena19,596
| 0–3
|- bgcolor = "#ffcccc"
| 4
| April 26
| Orlando
| 
| Tyrus Thomas (21)
| Tyrus Thomas (9)
| Stephen Jackson (8)
| Time Warner Cable Arena19,086
|0–4
|-

Player statistics

Regular season 

<small>1Stats with the Bobcats.

Playoffs

Awards, records and milestones

Awards

Week/Month

All-Star 
 Gerald Wallace was selected to his first All-Star game and the first selection for a Bobcat player in team history. He also competed in the Slam Dunk contest.

Season

Records 
First Bobcats Team to make it to the postseason.

Milestones 
The Bobcats made the playoffs for the first time ever, had a winning record for the first time ever, and had an NBA All-Star (Wallace) for the first time ever. They broke (and as of April 10 continue to set) a franchise record for wins in a season with 42, setting them for an above-.500 season. They clinched their first ever playoff berth April 8.

Injuries and surgeries

Transactions

References 

Charlotte Bobcats seasons
Charlotte
Bob
Bob